Natalia Sergeyevna Boyarskaya (born 27 February 1983) is a Russian former professional racing cyclist. She represented her country at the 2008 Summer Olympics in Beijing. Boyarskaya broke away from the main peloton in the road race and managed to build up a lead of 59 seconds, but had to stop when she could not see which way to choose. She was eventually caught and went on to finish 40th, and three days later she finished 16th in the time trial.

Major results

2000
 4th Road race, UCI Junior Road World Championships
2001
 UCI Junior Road World Championships
2nd  Time trial
4th Road race
 2nd  Points race, UEC European Junior Track Championships
 3rd  Points race, UCI Juniors Track World Championships
2002
 9th Road race, National Road Championships
2003
 9th Time trial, UEC European Under-23 Road Championships
2004
 4th Time trial, UEC European Under-23 Road Championships
 5th Overall Tour of Poland
2005
 5th Overall Tour of Poland
 7th Overall Gracia–Orlová
2006
 1st Stage 3 Grande Boucle Féminine Internationale
 7th Overall Giro della Toscana Int. Femminile – Memorial Michela Fanini
 10th Overall Tour Féminin en Limousin
2007
 National Road Championships
1st  Road race
6th Time trial
 5th Overall La Route de France
 6th Overall Tour Féminin en Limousin
2008
 1st Overall Tour Féminin en Limousin
1st Mountains classification
1st Stage 4
 National Road Championships
3rd Road race
3rd Time trial
 3rd Overall Wyscig Etapowy - Zamosc Féminin
 3rd Overall Gracia–Orlová
 9th Memorial Davide Fardelli
2010
 6th Overall Tour Féminin en Limousin
 7th GP de Plouay – Bretagne
 8th Overall Trophée d'Or Féminin
 10th Overall Giro della Toscana Int. Femminile – Memorial Michela Fanini
2011
 2nd Overall Gracia–Orlová
1st Stage 1
 2nd Overall Tour de Feminin-O cenu Českého Švýcarska
 3rd Team pursuit, National Track Championships
 9th Overall Thüringen Rundfahrt der Frauen
2012
 2nd Time trial, National Road Championships
 5th Open de Suède Vårgårda TTT
 5th Chrono Champenois
2013
 1st Overall Tour of Adygeya
1st Points classification
1st Stages 2 (ITT) & 4
 1st Grand Prix of Maykop
 6th Overall Gracia-Orlová
 6th Overall Tour de Bretagne Féminin
 10th Overall Tour de Feminin – O cenu Ceského Švýcarska
2014
 1st  Overall Tour of Adygeya
1st  Points classification
1st Stages 1 (ITT) & 2
 4th Overall Gracia-Orlová
1st Stage 2
 8th GP du Canton d'Argovie
 10th Nagrada Ljubljane TT
2015
 2nd Time trial, National Road Championships
 3rd Overall Tour of Adygeya
1st Prologue
 5th Overall Gracia–Orlová
 7th Grand Prix of Maykop
 8th Overall Tour de Bretagne Féminin
 8th Overall Giro della Toscana Int. Femminile – Memorial Michela Fanini
2016
 National Road Championships
1st  Road race
1st  Time trial
 3rd Overall Tour de Feminin-O cenu Českého Švýcarska
1st Stage 3 (ITT)
 6th Overall Tour of Zhoushan Island

References

External links

1983 births
Living people
Russian female cyclists
Olympic cyclists of Russia
Cyclists at the 2008 Summer Olympics
Sportspeople from Zabaykalsky Krai
Cyclists at the 2015 European Games
European Games competitors for Russia